Uromastyx benti, also known commonly as Bent's mastigure and the Yemeni spiny-tailed lizard, is a species of lizard in the family Agamidae. The species is native to the southeastern Arabian Peninsula.

Etymology
The specific name, benti, is in honor of English explorer James Theodore Bent.

Geographic range
U. benti is found in Oman and Yemen.

Habitat

Diet
U. benti is herbivorous, and its diet includes dry grasses.

Reproduction
U. benti is oviparous. Breeding takes place once a year, and clutch size is 6–12 eggs.

References

Further reading
Anderson J (1894). "On Two new Species of Agamoid Lizards from the Hadramut, South-eastern Arabia". Annals and Magazine of Natural History, Sixth Series 14: 376–378. (Aporoscelis benti, new species, pp. 376–377).
Sindaco R, Jeremčenko VK (2008). The Reptiles of the Western Palearctic. 1. Annotated Checklist and Distributional Atlas of the Turtles, Crocodiles, Amphisbaenians and Lizards of Europe, North Africa, Middle East and Central Asia. (Monographs of the Societas Herpetologica Italica). Latina, Italy: Edizioni Belvedere. 580 pp. .
Zilger H-J, Zwanzig B-M, Grossman W, Kowalski T, Ballandat S (2016). "Neue Angaben zur Verbreitung der Jemen-Dornschwanzagame Uromastyx benti (Anderson, 1894) im Sultanat Oman [= New data on the distribution of the Yemeni Spiny-tailed Agama Uromastyx benti in the Sultanate of Oman]". Sauria 38 (4) : 3–7. (in German).

Uromastyx
Reptiles described in 1894
Taxa named by John Anderson (zoologist)